"Scuta" is the plural of the Latin word "scutum" and means "shield". It is used for the following:

 Scutum (shield), the Roman shield
 Scute, a zootomical term

See also
 Scudo (disambiguation), various currencies